Post Proper Southside, also known as Post Proper South or Barangay 31, is one of the barangays of Makati, a city in Metro Manila, Philippines. It consists the southern tip of Bonifacio Global City and its claimed territory is largely covered by the Manila American Cemetery. The area is largely under the de facto administration of neighboring city of Taguig, which claims the Fort Bonifacio area as its own territory.

Geography

Most of the area is currently under the de facto jurisdiction of Taguig, under its barangays Fort Bonifacio, Western Bicutan, and Pinagsama. The remaining portion east of Circumferential Road 5 (C-5) is claimed by Taguig under its barangay Ususan and by Makati under its barangays Pembo and Rizal. However, the boundary is unclear due to the boundary dispute between Makati and Taguig.

Demographics
As per the 2015 census by the Philippine Statistics Authority, the barangay has a population of 52,428 which renders Southside as the largest barangay in Makati in terms of population.

References

Makati
Barangays of Metro Manila